The 1941 Michigan State Spartans football team represented Michigan State College as an independent during the 1941 college football season. In their ninth season under head coach Charlie Bachman, the Spartans compiled a 5–3–1 record and lost their annual rivalry game with Michigan by a 19 to 7 score. In inter-sectional play, the team lost to |Santa Clara (7–0) and defeated Temple (46–0) and West Virginia (14–12).

Schedule

Game summaries

Michigan

On September 27, 1941, Michigan State lost Michigan by a 19 to 7 score. The game was Michigan's first without Tom Harmon, who had led the Wolverines from 1938 to 1940. Sophomore tailback Tom Kuzma, from Harmon's home town of Gary, Indiana, took over Harmon's spot and scored two touchdowns in his first game for the Wolverines. Michigan State took the lead on the third play from scrimmage with a 74-yard sweep around left end by halfback Jack Fenton. Michigan came back with a touchdown in the second quarter and two more in the third quarter. In addition to Kuzma's two touchdowns, fullback Bob Westfall also scored on a one-yard run in the third quarter. Bob Ingalls kicked for one point after touchdown for Michigan. Michigan out-gained Michigan State on the ground with 235 rushing yards to 104 for the Spartans. Wilfrid Smith of the Chicago Tribune wrote that the key to Michigan's victory was its veteran line that "completely outplayed" the Spartans' line.

References

Michigan State
Michigan State Spartans football seasons
Michigan State Spartans football